Yakhak  is a village in Herat Province in northwestern Afghanistan.

See also 
 Herat Province

References 

Populated places in Herat Province
Villages in Afghanistan